The Sir Rickard Christophers Medal, named in honour of Sir Rickard Christophers, is awarded every three years to individuals for their work in the field of tropical medicine and hygiene. The awarding body is the Royal Society of Tropical Medicine and Hygiene.

Recipients
Source: RSTMH

See also

 List of medicine awards
 List of prizes named after people

References

British science and technology awards
Medicine awards
Awards established in 1979
Royal Society of Tropical Medicine and Hygiene